Coastal Command Anti U-Boat Devices School RAF is a former training school of the Royal Air Force's Coastal Command which was operational from 1940 until 1945 during the Second World War.

The Coastal Command Anti U-Boat Devices School RAF was formed on 20 April 1945 at RAF Limavady operating the Vickers Wellington GR Mk.VIII until August 1945 still at Limavady. The unit had several different identities beforehand.

History

The School was initially No. 7 Operational Training Unit which was formed on 15 June 1940 at RAF Hawarden operating a variety of aircraft including Supermarine Spitfires and Fairey Battles. The unit was initially disbanded on 1 November 1940 to become No. 57 OTU but was reformed on 1 April 1942 at Limavady as No. 7 (Coastal) Operational Training Unit using Vickers Wellingtons and Avro Ansons. The OTU was disbanded on 16 May 1944 at RAF Haverfordwest and became No. 4 Refresher Flying Unit.

No. 4 Refresher Flying Unit was a short lived unit formed at Haverfordwest on 16 May 1944 flying Wellingtons but was disbanded at RAF Mullaghmore on 5 October 1944 to become the Loran Training Unit. The U.S.-built LORAN navigation system was at that time entering service with Coastal Command.

The Loran Training Unit was formed at Mullaghmore flying Wellingtons on 5 October 1944 but was disbanded on 20 April 1945 to become the Coastal Command Anti U-Boat Devices School RAF.

References

Bibliography 

Training establishments of the Royal Air Force
Military units and formations disestablished in 1945